The Chapada Limpa Extractive Reserve is an extractive reserve in the state of Maranhão, Brazil.

Location

The Chapada Limpa Extractive Reserve is in the municipality of Chapadinha, Maranhão.
The reserve is in the Chapadinha (Alto Munim) microregion of the Leste Maranhense mesoregion, on the frontier of soybean monoculture in the state.
It is in the Munim River basin and is drained by tributaries of the Iguará, Mocambo and Preto rivers and various intermittent streams.
The terrain contains areas of plateau and slopes, with remains of caatinga and many swamps and waterways.
It has species typical of the cerrado, the Amazon and the caatinga biome.

Economy

The reserve contains the traditional communities of Chapada Limpa I, Chapada Limpa II, Califórnia, Juçaral, Mata, Morada Nova, Porco Magro, Prata, Quatro Bocas, Roça Velha, Saco, Santana, São Gabriel, São Martins and Severo.
In 2016 the Ministry of the Environment said there were 116 registered families with 531 people organized into five neighbourhood associations.
The population density was 4.43 inhabitants per km2.
Residents in the lower parts of the reserve extract babassu for income, and use the juçara, buriti and bacaba palms typical of the wetland environment for family use.
They also practice subsistence agriculture, growing rice, beans and corn.

History

The region had for years been an area of conflict between the traditional extractive population and soybean agribusinesses.
The reserve conserved part of one of the most threatened biomes in the country.
It was the first extractive reserve in the cerrado biome in Maranhão.
It is administered by the federal  Chico Mendes Institute for Biodiversity Conservation (ICMBio).
The reserve is classed as IUCN protected area category VI (protected area with sustainable use of natural resources).
Its objectives are to protect the livelihoods and ensure the use and conservation of renewable natural resources traditionally used by the extractive population.

On 12 November 2008 the Instituto Nacional de Colonização e Reforma Agrária (INCRA – National Institute for Colonisation and Agrarian Reform) recognised the reserve as meeting the needs of 62 families, who would qualify for PRONAF support. This was modified on 19 November 2008 to read 122 families.
The deliberative council was created on 17 May 2011.
The management agreement was approved on 29 February 2016.

Notes

Sources

2007 establishments in Brazil
Extractive reserves of Brazil
Protected areas of Maranhão